Kelbarrow is a hamlet in Cumbria, England. It is located in close proximity to Grasmere, with views of Grasmere Lake.

Notable people
John Vaux of Kelbarrow, Constable of Carlisle in 1564.
Edward Brown Lees
Helen Sumner, granddaughter of Archbishop Sumner -antiquarian

References

Hamlets in Cumbria
South Lakeland District